In the 1873 Iowa State Senate elections, Iowa voters elected state senators to serve in the fifteenth Iowa General Assembly. Elections were held in 23 of the state senate's 50 districts. State senators serve four-year terms in the Iowa State Senate.

The general election took place on October 14, 1873.

Following the previous election, Republicans had control of the Iowa Senate with 42 seats to Democrats' eight seats.

To claim control of the chamber from Republicans, the Democrats needed to net 18 Senate seats.

Republicans maintained control of the Iowa State Senate following the 1873 general election with the balance of power shifting to Republicans holding 36 seats, Democrats having 10 seats, and four Anti-Monopoly members (a net gain of 2 seats for Democrats and 4 seats for the Anti-Monopoly Party).

Summary of Results
Note: Redistricting occurred before the 1873 general election. Any holdover Senators not up for re-election and whose district numbers did not change are unlisted on this table.

Source:

Detailed Results
NOTE: The Iowa Official Register does not contain detailed vote totals for state senate elections in 1873.

See also
 Elections in Iowa

External links
District boundaries in the Iowa Senate were redrawn before the 1873 general election.
Iowa Senate Districts 1872-1873 map
Iowa Senate Districts 1874-1877 map

References

Iowa Senate
Iowa
Iowa Senate elections